Prof Herbert Westren Turnbull FRS FRSE LLD (31 August 1885 – 4 May 1961) was an English mathematician. From 1921 to 1950 he was Regius Professor of Mathematics at the University of St Andrews.

Life

He was born in the Tettenhall district, on the outskirts of Wolverhampton on 31 August 1885, the eldest of five sons of William Peveril Turnbull, HM Inspector of Schools. He was educated at Sheffield Grammar School then studied Mathematics at Cambridge University graduating MA.

After serving as lecturer at St. Catharine's College, Cambridge (1909), the University of Liverpool (1910), and the University of Hong Kong (1912), Turnbull became master at St. Stephen's College in Hong Kong (1911–15), and warden of the University Hostel (1913–15). He was a Fellow at St John's College, Oxford (1919–26), and from 1921 held a chair of mathematics at the University of St Andrews.

In 1922 he was elected a Fellow of the Royal Society of Edinburgh. His proposers were Arthur Crichton Mitchell, Sir Edmund Taylor Whittaker, Cargill Gilston Knott, and Herbert Stanley Allen. He won the Society's Keith Prize for 1923-25 and the Gunning Victoria Jubilee Prize for 1940–1944. In 1932 he was elected a Fellow of the Royal Society.

He was a keen mountain climber and served as President of the Scottish Mountaineering Club from 1948 to 1950.

He retired in 1950 and died at Grasmere in the Lake District on 4 May 1961.

Family

In 1911 he married Ella Drummond Williamson, daughter of Canon H. D. Williamson. They had one daughter.

Selected publications

with A. C. Aitken: 
as editor:  The correspondence of Isaac Newton, first 3 vols (1959–1961) out of a total of 7 vols (1959–77).

References

20th-century English mathematicians
1885 births
1961 deaths
People from Wolverhampton
Alumni of the University of Cambridge
Academics of the University of Cambridge
Fellows of the Royal Society
Fellows of the Royal Society of Edinburgh
People educated at Sheffield Grammar School